William Young (1884–1917) was an English footballer who played in the Football League for West Bromwich Albion.

References

1884 births
1917 deaths
English footballers
Association football midfielders
English Football League players
Hednesford Town F.C. players
West Bromwich Albion F.C. players
Worcester City F.C. players
Kidderminster Harriers F.C. players